The 2000 Adidas International was a combined men's and women's tennis tournament played on outdoor hard courts at the NSW Tennis Centre in Sydney in Australia that was part of the International Series of the 2000 ATP Tour and of Tier II of the 2000 WTA Tour. The tournament ran from 9 through 15 January 2000. Lleyton Hewitt and Amelie Mauresmo won the singles titles.

Finals

Men's singles

 Lleyton Hewitt defeated  Jason Stoltenberg 6–4, 6–0

Women's singles

 Amelie Mauresmo defeated  Lindsay Davenport 7–6(7–2), 6–4

Men's doubles

 Mark Woodforde /  Todd Woodbridge defeated  Lleyton Hewitt /  Sandon Stolle 7–5 6–4

Women's doubles

 Julie Halard-Decugis /  Ai Sugiyama defeated  Martina Hingis /  Mary Pierce 6–0, 6–3

References

External links
 Official website
 ATP tournament profile
 WTA tournament profile

 
Adidas International
Adidas International
Adidas
Adidas International
Adidas International, 2000